Luz Marina Zuluaga Zuluaga (October 31, 1938 – December 2, 2015) was a Colombian beauty queen who won Miss Universe 1958. She was the only Colombian woman to win the Miss Universe pageant until Paulina Vega became Miss Universe 2014.

Biography
Zuluaga was born in Pereira. She moved to Manizales, (Department of Caldas) as a small child and grew up there. She applied for the Miss Caldas contest, and she won in 1957. Zuluaga went on with her training towards the Miss Colombia contest and arrived in Cartagena, hoping to win the Miss Colombia title. Pereira is part of the Caldas department. Risaralda was made a department in 1966 some years after her election. She represented the following local titles Miss Pereira, Miss Caldas, Miss Colombia Virreina (1st Runner up), Miss Colombia — Winner and then Miss Universe.

Miss Colombia 1957
Zuluaga did not win the contest, instead finishing as 1st Runner-Up. Before the Miss Universe pageant however, Miss Colombia 1957, Doris Gil Santamaria got married. Due to Miss Universe rules stating that no candidate can be married before the final contest itself, Santamaria was forced to resign, making Zuluaga Miss Colombia by default.

Miss Universe
The contest took place in Long Beach, California, on July 25, 1958. After Zuluaga was announced as the new Miss Universe, the only television station and most radio stations in Colombia at the time (as much as seventy-three) stopped their regular programming to report the breaking news.  The evening gown she wore in the pageant was designed and made for her by Colombian designer Aura Leonor Troya de Sánchez, who was a designer to the stars including at least three Miss Colombias.

Zuluaga was not immediately able to return to her country, as Miss Universe personnel feared for her security because at the time Colombia was going through a period of extreme political volatility. When she eventually returned home, she was welcomed by large crowds both at El Dorado International Airport in Bogotá and at Manizales airport.

By now, the citizens of Manizales had accepted her as if she had been a native of the area. Learning that her family was not well off economically, many citizens collected money, which was used to build a better house for Zuluaga and her family.

Life After Titleholding
After years outside the spotlight, Zuluaga made headlines again when she married a medical doctor and moved to the United States. In 1966, she returned to Manizales and became involved with the city council as well as with the state's institute of tourism, of which she eventually became director.

Zuluaga had three sons and a daughter. She died on December 2, 2015 at the age of 77 at her home in Manizales.

Notes

References

External links
  Colombia.com

1938 births
2015 deaths
Colombian beauty pageant winners
Miss Colombia winners
Miss Universe 1958 contestants
Miss Universe winners